India Since the 90s is a six-volume collection of texts and images produced over the last three decades, in social theory, performance, moving image practices, urban studies, museum studies and photography. The six titles in the series are The Hunger of the Republic: Our Present in Retrospect (edited by Ashish Rajadhyaksha), Improvised Futures: Encountering the Body in Performance (edited by: Ranjana Dave), The Vanishing Point: Moving Images After Video (edited by: Rashmi Devi Sawhney), Cities on the Ground: The New ‘Urban’ Experience (edited by Solomon Benjamin and the Frozen Fish Collective), Another Lens: Photography Practices and Image Cultures (edited by: Rahaab Allana) and Ghosts of Future Nations: Gods, Migrants and Tribals in the Late-Modern Museum (edited by: Kavita Singh). The series, conceptualised by Series Editor Ashish Rajadhyaksha, and designed by Gauri Nagpal, was conceived in collaboration with the Shanghai-based West Heavens initiative supported by the Hong Kong-based art curator Chang Tsong-Zung.  Three titles have been published in the series in 2021-2022.

Volume 1 Hunger of the Republic: Our Present in Retrospect 

The first volume addresses India’s political history, and comprises essays largely framed by critical political developments of the 1990s, such as protests after the Mandal Commission report (1990), the assassination of Rajiv Gandhi (1991), the demolition of Babri Masjid (1992), the Bombay bombings (1993) and the Gujarat riots (2002). Its first essay frames the overall approach, taken from social scientist Rajni Kothari’s last major book before he died, ‘Democracy: In Search of a Theory’ (2005). Its central theme is the transformation of the relationship between the Indian state and its people, in its new status as parens patriae (or parent of the people), as Veena Das shows in her 1995 essay on the Bhopal gas tragedy, ‘Suffering, Legitimacy and Healing’. Utsa Patnaik’s 2004 essay, ‘The Republic of Hunger’ also discusses how a similar transformation makes famine-like conditions in large parts of India invisible. Historian Gyanendra Pandey’s 1991 essay ‘In Defence of the Fragment: Writing about Hindu-Muslim Riots’, looks at the 1989 riots in Bhagalpur that he studied as part of a human rights team, and asks how the teaching of Indian history can account for episodes such as this. Human rights activist Teesta Setalvad’s 2007 essay “Being their Target’ produces a personal account of the extreme power of such a state apparatus in targeting political dissenters.

Other essays in the volume include:

 ‘The Imaginary Institution of India’ (1992) by Sudipta Kaviraj
 The Andhra Pradesh Civil Liberties Committee (APCLC) report ‘The Chundur Carnage’ (1991), also known as the Tsundur massacre.
 ‘India and the Colonial Mode of Production’ by Hamza Alawi (1975)
 ‘Rich Peasant, Poor Peasant’ by K. Balagopal (1988)
 ‘Beyond the Nationalist Panopticon: The Experience of Cyberpublics in India’ by Ravi Sundaram (1996)
 ‘The Republic of Babel: Language and Political Subjectivity in Free India” by M. Madhava Prasad (2011)
 ‘Void and Memory: Story of a Statue’ by M.S.S. Pandian (2004)
 ‘Media Trials and Courtroom Tribulations: The Battle of Images, Words and Shadows in the 13 December Case’ by Shuddhabrata Sengupta (2005) 
 ‘Unframed’, Jayant Kaikini’s short story (1993)
 ‘Hindu Death and Our Death’ by Kancha Ilaiah Shepherd (1996)
 ‘Interrogating the Thesis of ‘Irrational Deification’ by Sharmila Rege (2008)
 ‘Violence’ by Sunil Mohan and Rumi Harish (2013)
 ‘Questions and Dialogue’ by Anita Dube (1987)

Several art works by Riyas Komu, K.P. Krishnakumar, K.P. Reji, Vivan Sundaram, Atul Dodiya and Raqs Media Collective are juxtaposed by letters addressed to the Supreme Court on abolition of Section 377 of the Indian Penal Code, photographs of the Union Carbide plant after the gas disaster, maps, excerpts of the People’s Union of Civil Liberties report on Bhagalpur, and images from the APCLC report on Tsundur. A running thread is produced by a meme of the figure of Ritwik Ghatak hovering over newspaper reports of major political episodes in late 1980s and 90s India.

Volume 2 Improvised Futures: Encountering the Body in Performance 

The second volume foregrounds the human body in various conditions of performance. Its framing argument comes from a manifesto statement by the dancer Chandralekha, titled ‘Militant Origins of Indian Dance’ (1980). Both Navtej Johar’s short text ‘True to the Bone’ (2018) and Padmini Chettur’s ‘The Body Laboratory’ (2016) explore the new demands on the dancer’s body, and Leela Samson’s ‘Classical Dance in Contemporary India’ (2014) addresses the larger question of tradition and what it can mean in the present.

Street theatre is addressed through Safdar Hashmi’s play ‘Halla Bol’ (1988). The musical persona of Lata Mangeshkar is evoked through a major debate on the singer’s voice in Economic & Political Weekly (in 2004-05) and through the persona of M.S. Subbulakshmi as seen by musician T.M. Krishna (‘MS-Understood: the Myths and Misconceptions around M.S. Subbulakshmi, 2015). The debate on the legal rights of Mumbai’s bar dancers is explored through essays by Anna Morcom (‘The Continuation and Repetition of History: The Dance Ban as Anti Nautch II’, 2013) and Sameena Dalwai (‘Caste and the Bar Dancer’ 2013). Reality television and the sexed-up body is described by Rahul Bhatia’s text ‘Hot and Bothered: Under the Sun with the Aspiring Stars of MTV’s Splitsvilla’ (2013). The virtualisation of the body into a data subject is discussed by Maya Indira Ganesh’s ‘You Auto-Complete Me: Romancing the Bot’ (2019) and Mila Samdub’s ‘The Archers and Swordsmen of Digital India’ (2020).

Other essays include

 ‘Untaming Restraint and the Deferred Apology’ by Natasha Ginwala (2018) 
 Danish Sheikh’s play Contempt (2018) 
 Orijit Singh’s graphic text on Rohith Vemula’s suicide note
 ‘Conceptualizing Popular Culture: Lavani and Powada in Maharashtra’ by Sharmila Rege (2002)
 ‘Kafka’s Castle: How to Perform a Good Employee’ by Amitesh Grover (2017)
 ‘Not the Keynote Address’ by Akshara K.V. (2008).
 ‘Politics of Location: A View of Theatrical Contemporaneity in India’ by Gargi Bharadwaj (2019)
 ‘Contemporary Theatre Practice in Manipur: A Reckoning’ by Trina Nila Bannerjee (2019)
 Excerpt from Anand Patwardhan’s film Jai Bhim Comrade (2011)
 ‘Friends with Benefits’ by Ranjana Dave (2017)
 ‘A Garland of Rivers’ by Skye Arundhati Thomas (2017)

Accompanying the texts are a visual photomontage. Natasha Ginwala’s essay for example is designed alongside images of the Shaheen Bagh protests of 2019, students at Jamia Millia Islamia, a campaign response by the Colombo-based A Collective for Feminist Conversations on the re-imposing of the Sri Lankan ban on women purchasing alcohol in 2018, JNU Student leader Aishe Ghosh shortly after she was attacked on the university campus, and images of Bindu and Kanakadurga, women who entered Kerala’s Sabarimala temple in early 2019 before daybreak with a police escort, challenging blockades set up outside the temple by religious groups seeking to prevent their entry.

Volume 3 Vanishing Point: Moving Images After Video 

The third volume in the series, looks at the life of the moving image ever since digital technology replaced celluloid.  Even at the time of celluloid, there was a leakage into popular memory had posed a problem for the film archive, as Sudhir Mahadevan’s 2015 essay, from his book A Very Old Machine, suggests. Now, celluloid’s elimination has pushed what used to be the cinema into a haunting, ghostly, absence, as several authors show, such as Subhajit Chatterjee’s 2019 essay ‘The Brothers Ghosh: Bengal, Its Art Cinema and Its Homegrown Exploitation Genres’ (2019), which shows how several well known films from the 1960s were remade in the 2000s as pornography. The media art collective Desire Machine shows how movie theatres turned into military camps in Srinagar (‘Death Becomes Her: Bombay Cinema, Nation and Kashmir’, 2014).

Media artist Jeebesh Bagchi’s essay on the Cinematic Object after the 1990s shows how digital versions of cinema leak into a new commerce of the moving image. Lawrence Liang explores the forms that such an economy produces, in his essay ‘From Cinema to the Moving Image and Back’ (2012). Documentary filmmaker R.V. Ramani, known for making a cinema of spontaneity and informality, recounts when he almost drowned in the tsunami in 2004 while clinging on for dear life to his camera, and later made a film he called My Camera and Tsunami (2011).

Art critic Geeta Kapur’s 2004 essay ‘A Cultural Conjuncture in India: Art into Documentary’ speaks of how different art practices came together under a particular challenge posed to documentary film in the wake of the Gujarat riots of 2002, and the elections of 2004 that saw the defeat of the BJP. It frames a section in which several essays look at the documentary impetus in the multimedia environments of artist Sheba Chachi (see ‘Sheba Chhachhi’s Multimedia Environments’ by Nancy Adajania, 2018), the work of the Mediastorm Collective and of the filmmaker Paromita Vohra (‘Who Is the First Person? On Making Documentaries’, 2011).

The texts accompany found images from mainstream films, alongside art work, as example, the opening essay by the Raqs Media Collective, ‘Now and Elsewhere: The Problem and the Provocation’ (2010) is accompanied by a still from Mochu’s digital video ‘Cool Memories of Remote Gods’ (2017) and a montage of dance by Madhubala in Mughal-e-Azam.

Other texts in the book include

 ‘In the Face of Ambiguity, Refuse the Temptation to Guess’ by Sebastian Lutgert (2021)
 ‘Disappearance, Desire and Haunting’ by Darshana Sreedhar Mini (2016)
 ‘Mediastorm: Memories of a Collective’ by Mediastorm (1991)
 ‘Thought Bubbles’ by Nalini Malani (2020)
 ‘SRK, Cinema and the Citizen: What’s Next?’ by Ashish Rajadhyaksha (2010)
 ‘Firing Time’ by Geeta Patel (2016)
 ‘Toward a New Frame for Regional Films: Manbhum Videos and the Other Side of (Indian) Cinema’ by Madhuja Mukherjee (2016)
 ‘The Gaddar Effect: Maoism, Mass Culture and the Legacies of Cinema’ by S.V. Srinivas (2016)

Future volumes 
In 2023 the urban studies historian Solomon Benjamin, along with the Frozen Fish Collective, will publish their volume titled Cities on the Ground: the New ‘Urban Experience, and photography curator, publisher and author Rahaab Allana will publish Another Lens: Photography Practices and Image Cultures. In 2024, art historian Kavita Singh will publish her compilation Ghosts of Future Nations: Gods, Migrants and Tribals in the Late-Modern Museum.

Reception 
The book series has been distributed through independent circuits, via the Independent Publishers and Distributors Alternatives (IPDA). In November 2022, four institutions, the dance venue Khuli Khirkee, Mayday Books/Studio Safdar, the Centre for the Study of Developing Societies and the Foundation of Indian Contemporary Art (FICA) came together with Tulika Books to perform events across Delhi that drew from the books. Among the events was a performance by the Jana Natya Manch using Teesta Setalvad’s essay ‘Being Their Target’, combining texts from this essay with Justice D.Y. Chandrachud’s 2018 Supreme Court dissenting judgment on Aadhar, and Safdar Hashmi’s 1979 manifesto on street theatre, followed by a conversation with Teesta Setalvad. The first volume was reviewed by Benjamin Siegel for Pacific Affairs, who called it 'a valuable albeit difficult collection... Its curation is inspired, though its audience is somewhat unclear, with familiar and foundational texts side-by-side with more obscure selections. The second volume has been reviewed in The Hindu March 17, 2022 (‘The Body and Soul Story’), which wrote that ‘instead of a typical collection of academic essays and articles, what we have is an interspersion of theatre and documentary scripts, Rohit Vemula’s suicide note, first-person ruminations by performers, as well as theories and analyses… peppered with interesting photomontages’.

References

External links
https://tulikabooks.in/catalog/product/view/id/22375
https://tulikabooks.in/catalog/product/view/id/22374
https://tulikabooks.in/catalog/product/view/id/22406

History books about India